Khar Turan National Park or Touran Wildlife Refuge is a National Park in Iran. It is situated in the Semnan province, southeast of Shahrud.
Khar Turan National Park also called the little Africa in Iran, is registered as the second biosphere reserve in the world by UNESCO (biosphere reserves are protected areas of ecosystems promoting solutions to reconcile the conservation of biodiversity with sustainable use), Turan National Park and Wildlife Refuge is one of the astonishing expanses to observe the mysteries of the wildlife accustomed to arid and semi-arid regions of Iran. Being the second-largest reserve in this country, this park embraces arid highlands, lowlands, mounts, sands, and endless salt pans.

Fauna 
Khar Turan is home to one of the largest populations of the critically endangered Asiatic cheetah. There were about 12 – 15 of these cats in the area. Occasional reports of females with cubs indicate a breeding and perhaps growing population. On late December 2014, four new cheetahs have been spotted by camera traps. Another four new individuals consisting of a female and her three cubs had been reported in January 2015, after another eleven new cheetahs were spotted a month before, and an additional eight cheetahs had been spotted in July 2015. With the increasing numbers of cheetahs in Khar Turan, there is an estimated population of between 39 and 42 individuals.

Khar Turan has the largest population of Persian onager, and two species of gazelles: the goitered gazelle and Indian gazelle, both in good numbers. There are also wild sheep and goats in the reserve.

See also 
 Kharturan Rural District
 Nayband Wildlife Sanctuary
 Turan
 Wildlife of Iran

References

External links 
 Information to Asiatic cheetah at wildlifeextra.com
 image of Touran National Park
 Touran National Park on wikimapia

National parks of Iran
Biosphere reserves of Iran
Geography of Semnan Province
Tourist attractions in Semnan Province